Mander is a village in the Dutch province of Overijssel. It is a part of the municipality of Tubbergen, and lies about 15 km northeast of Almelo.

It was first mentioned in 797 as Manheri. The etymology is unclear. In 1840, it was home 440 people.

Among the points of special interest are two watermills, some hidden tumuli, and the land art project 'Mander Circles' by Paul de Kort. The crop circles are old, and have not been made by aliens, but were constructed in the 1920s by Jannink to improve efficiency. The circles had become overgrown, and were restored in 2000. They are best observed from the air.

Gallery

References

Populated places in Overijssel
Twente
Tubbergen